Kamal al-Din Gazurgahi (also spelled Gazorgahi) was an Iranian author and religious dignitary of the late 15th and early 16th centuries. He is principally known for his Majalis al-ushshaq, a Persian biographical dictionary of over 70 poets, Sufis, and members of the Turkic ruling elites.

Born in 1469/70, Gazurgahi was the nephew of Sayyid Zayn al-Abidin Junabadi, a landowner from Junabad, who served in the diwan of the Timurid Empire. In 1499, Gazurgahi was appointed as the sadr of the Timurid realm. In 1502/3, he completed his Majalis al-ushshaq.

References

Sources 
 
 
 
 

15th-century Iranian people
16th-century Iranian people
Officials of the Timurid Empire
1460s births
16th-century deaths

Year of birth uncertain
Year of death unknown